Serik Samatovich Yeleuov (born 15 December 1980) is a Kazakhstani boxer who won the bronze medal in the men's lightweight (– 60 kg) division at the 2004 Summer Olympics. In the final bout, he defeated Iran's Mohamed Asheri. Yeleuov qualified for the Athens Games by placing first at the 1st AIBA Asian 2004 Olympic Qualifying Tournament in Guangzhou, China.

Olympic results
1st round bye
Defeated Manuel Félix Díaz (Dominican Republic) 28-16
Defeated Domenico Valentino (Italy) 29-23
Lost to Amir Khan (Great Britain) 26-40

References
sports-reference

1980 births
Living people
Boxers at the 2004 Summer Olympics
Olympic boxers of Kazakhstan
Olympic bronze medalists for Kazakhstan
Olympic medalists in boxing
Medalists at the 2004 Summer Olympics
Kazakhstani male boxers
Lightweight boxers
Sportspeople from Karaganda
21st-century Kazakhstani people